Yabrud is a Palestinian village in the Ramallah and al-Bireh Governorate in the central West Bank. It is located approximately 13 km northeast of the city of Ramallah and its elevation is 790 m. According to the Palestinian Central Bureau of Statistics (PCBS) 2007 estimates, the town had a population of 644.

Location
Yabrud is located 8.7 km northeast of Ramallah. It is bordered by Silwad to the east and north, 'Ein Siniya village to the west, and Silwad and 'Ein Yabrud territories to the south.

History
Potsherds from the Iron Age II and the Byzantine eras have been found here. Byzantine remains have been incorporated into a local wely.

Yaqut (1179–1229) noted about Ein Yabrud and Yabrud: "A village lying north of Jerusalem, on the road from the Holy City to Nabulus, between which and Yabrud is Kafar Natha. It possesses orchards and vineyards, and olives and Sumach trees."

Potsherds from the Crusader/Ayyubid and Mamluk era have also been found here.

Ottoman era
Yabrud was incorporated into the Ottoman Empire in 1517 with all of Palestine, and in 1596 it appeared in the tax registers as being in the nahiya of Al-Quds in the liwa of Al-Quds. It had a population of 28 household; who were all Muslims. They paid a fixed tax-rate of 33.3% on agricultural products, including wheat, barley, olive trees, vineyards/fruit trees, goats and beehives, in addition to occasional revenues; a total of 3,500 akçe.  Potsherds from the Ottoman era have also been found here.

In 1838, Yebrud was noted as Muslim village in the Beni Murrah district, north of Jerusalem.

In 1870, Victor Guérin described Yabroud as being located on a hill, with five hundred inhabitants, and whose plantations, vineyards and figs were very well maintained.  An Ottoman village list from about the same year, 1870, found that Jabrud had a population of 127, in 36 houses, though the population count included men, only.

In 1882, the PEF's Survey of Western Palestine described Yebrud as: "a village of small size a hill, with a well and extensive fig gardens or terraces to the east, and olives to the west. The roads are here walled in."

In 1896 the population of Jabrud was estimated to be about 276 persons.

British Mandate era
In the 1922 census of Palestine, conducted by the British Mandate authorities, Yabrud had a population of 199 Muslims, increasing in the 1931 census to 254 Muslims, in 60 houses.

In the 1945 statistics Yabrud had a population of 300 Muslims, while the total land area was 2,431 dunams, according to an official land and population survey. Of this, 1,290 were used for plantations and irrigable land, 350 for cereals, while 26 dunams were classified as built-up (urban) areas.

Jordanian era
In the wake of the 1948 Arab–Israeli War, and after the 1949 Armistice Agreements, Yabrud came under Jordanian rule.

In 1961, the population of Yabrud was  349.

1967-present
Since the Six-Day War in 1967, Yabrud has been under Israeli occupation.

After the 1995 accords, 79.4% of village land was classified as Area B, the remaining 20.6% as Area C.

References

Bibliography

External links
 Official website - archived (Arabic)
Welcome to Yabrud
Yabrud, Welcome to Palestine
Survey of Western Palestine, Map 14: IAA, Wikimedia commons 
Riwaq's Registry of Historic Buildings in Palestine - Yabrud (Arabic)
Yabrud village (fact sheet), Applied Research Institute–Jerusalem (ARIJ)
Yabrud village profile, ARIJ
Yabrud aerial photo, ARIJ
Locality Development Priorities and Needs in Yabrud Village, ARIJ

Villages in the West Bank
Municipalities of the State of Palestine